A vocal group is a performing ensemble of vocalists who sing and harmonize together. The first well-known vocals groups emerged in the 19th century, and the style had reached widespread popularity by the 1940s.

Types 
Vocal groups can come in several different forms, including:

 Boy band — vocal group consisting of (young) males
 Co-ed group — vocal group consisting of both males and females, typically in their teens or early twenties
 Choir
 Doo-wop group
 Girl group — vocal group consisting of (young) females
 Vocal quartet (as well as vocal trios and quintets)
 Barbershop quartet — a cappella close-harmony vocal group
 Gospel quartet

See also
 List of vocal groups
 Vocal Group Hall of Fame

References

 

Group